Morsan is a commune in the Eure department in Normandy in northern France.
The inhabitants are called Morsanais.

History
In medieval times Morsan was also written Morçan, Morsent or Morseng. It belonged to the Bec Abbey until Jean de Morsent 1276 affirmed that he needed his wealth for his followers in times of war.

Chevalier Philémon Lesens (also Le Sens), was the first baron of Morsan. He was nobleman of the Maison du Roi
of King Henry IV of France and governor of Bernay. He built a hunting lodge. At the time of Abdon-Thomas-François Lesens (1724–1800), who had been page of Louis XV of France before he became marquis of Morsan, Ange-Jacques Gabriel (1698–1782) redesigned the facade. The hunting lodge is privately owned nowadays.

Morsan got municipal administration in 1789.

In 1871, during the Franco-Prussian War Morsan was garrisoned by the Prussian army. In 1940, during World War II it was garrisoned by the German army.

There are no streetnames in Morsan, the village is divided in districts. The old districts of Morsan were: le Château, la Couranterie, les Jumeaux, la Mourioterie, la Mondière. The center of the village is called Bourg instead of la Mondière today.

Morsan is one of the communes in Eure under the risk of sudden forming of deneholes. In former times the peasants have exploited the marl underground to fertilize the fields. During heavy rain those ancient excavations can open again. These special deneholes are round holes of 1,5–2 meters diameter and several meters deep. There are around 16000 of those holes in the département Eure.

Population

See also
Communes of the Eure department

References

External links

Morsan on the site of the Prefecture of Eure (French)
Morsan on Les Communes de France
Morsan on the annuaire-mairie (French)

Communes of Eure